Zofia Hilczer-Kurnatowska (1932-2013) was a Polish archaeologist. In 1982, Hilczer-Kurnatowska received the title of professor of humanities. Her main area of research was the archeology of Early Middle Ages. She was a member of the Polish Academy of Sciences. In 1993 Hilczer-Kurnatowska was awarded the Knight's Cross of the Order of Polonia Restituta.

Select publications
 Ostrogi polskie z X-XIII w. (1953)
 Dorzecze górnej i środkowej Obry od VI do początków XI w. (1967)
 Słowiańszczyzna południowa (1973)
 Początki Polski (2002)

20th-century Polish archaeologists
Members of the Polish Academy of Sciences
Members of the Polish Academy of Learning
1932 births
2013 deaths
Polish women academics
Polish women archaeologists
Knights of the Order of Polonia Restituta
Medieval archaeologists